James Rogers House in Belleview, Kentucky is a Queen Anne-style farmhouse built in 1903.  It was listed on the National Register of Historic Places in 1989.

It is a modified T-form frame house with three cross-gables.  It was built by carpenters John Presser and Henry Griffith and stonemason Timothy Hogan.  It was one of six Queen Anne style buildings identified in Boone County in a survey.  A smokehouse and a livestock barn on the property are also contributing buildings.

References

National Register of Historic Places in Boone County, Kentucky
Queen Anne architecture in Kentucky
Houses completed in 1903
Houses in Boone County, Kentucky
Houses on the National Register of Historic Places in Kentucky
1903 establishments in Kentucky